The Sail @ Marina Bay is a waterfront lifestyle condominium located in the Marina Bay area in Singapore. It was completed in 2008. The first tenants have moved into Central Park Tower in July 2008. Residents moved into Marina Bay Tower a few weeks later. This development offers panoramic city view of Marina Bay and the sea. It is close to some of Singapore's famous landmarks such as Suntec City, Marina Bay Sands, Esplanade, Telok Ayer Market and the Singapore River. The Downtown MRT station is built a few meters to the West of the building. The building was erected on reclaimed land, and the Central Linear Park is built on the South Side next to the building.

History 
Before the site was sold to developers, City Developments Limited and AIG Global Real Estate, the  land parcel was sold as a "white site", which means the developer is free to use the site for commercial and/or residential use, by the URA. After the sale, the developer indicated their intention to use it predominantly for residential use with the first level or two for shop units. Their plan was approved by the government. Once completed, it included the first residential development in the New Downtown and is also the tallest predominantly residential development in the city.

The 99-year leasehold site was launched for public tender on 14 March 2002.

The original design for the building was 69 storeys for Marina Bay Tower, and 58 storeys for Central Park Tower. After the design was finalised by the NBBJ, the number of storeys was revised upwards to 70 storeys for Marina Bay Tower, and 63 storeys for Central Park Tower.

Design 
The condominium was designed by Peter Pran and Timothy Johnson with leading design firm NBBJ. The two buildings include a glass facade, sculpted Marina Bay Tower to look like a sail, and configured the complex representative of a huge canyon, reflecting his utilisation of inspirations by the sun, the wind, and the water respectively.

It has  of retail space, and an underground link to Raffles Place MRT station. It will offer 1,111 99-year leasehold residential units, 438 one-bedroom units, 418 two-bedroom units, 175 three-bedroom units, 75 four-bedroom units, and five penthouses, with the largest almost .

The architectural model of the structure was made by Richard Tenguerian.

Construction 
The main-contractor, Dragages Singapore Pte Ltd, has allowed for many technical innovations in the design of the towers: seismic design - the towers can resist to earthquakes (although unknown to date in Singapore), construction over the MRT line, construction on a very unstable soil.

See also
Tall buildings in Singapore
List of tallest buildings in the world

References

External links
 Pictures and Information
 Urban Redevelopment Authority
 Building & Construction Authority
 Marina Bay Official Website

City Developments Limited
Downtown Core (Singapore)
Marina Bay, Singapore
Residential buildings completed in 2008
Residential skyscrapers in Singapore
Twin towers
2008 establishments in Singapore